The San Francisco Film Critics Circle Award for Best Foreign Language Film, given by the San Francisco Film Critics Circle, honors the finest achievements in filmmaking.

Winners

2000s

2010s

2020s 

San Francisco Film Critics Circle Awards
Film awards for Best Foreign Language Film